The Apprentice 1 can refer to:

The Apprentice (British series 1)
The Apprentice (American season 1)